|}

The Irish Derby (Irish: Dearbaí na hÉireann) is a Group 1 flat horse race in Ireland open to three-year-old thoroughbred colts and fillies. It is run at the Curragh over a distance of 1 mile and 4 furlongs (2,414 metres), and it is scheduled to take place each year in late June or early July.

It is Ireland's equivalent of the Epsom Derby, and it is currently held three weeks after the English race.

History
The earliest version of the Irish Derby was an event called the O'Darby Stakes. This was established in 1817, but it was discontinued after 1824. A subsequent race titled the Curragh Derby was inaugurated in 1848, but this was again short-lived.

The modern Irish Derby was created by the 3rd Earl of Howth, the 3rd Marquess of Drogheda and the 3rd Earl of Charlemont. It was first run in 1866, and it was initially contested over 1 mile, 6 furlongs and 3 yards. It was extended by 9 yards in 1869, and cut to its present distance in 1872. The first Epsom Derby winner to achieve victory in the Irish version was Orby, trained in Ireland by Fred McCabe, in 1907.

The Irish Derby became a major international race in 1962, when its prize money was substantially increased. Joe McGrath, a founder of the Irish Hospitals' Sweepstake, combined the race with the sweepstake, and it became known as the Irish Sweeps Derby. The event began to regularly attract the winners of the Epsom Derby, and Santa Claus became the second horse to win both races in 1964.

The Irish Derby was sponsored by Budweiser from 1986 to 2007, and it has been backed by Dubai Duty Free since 2008. It is currently staged on the second day of the Curragh's three-day Irish Derby Festival meeting.

A total of eighteen horses have now completed the English-Irish Derby double, and the most recent was Harzand in 2016.

Records
Leading jockey (6 wins):
 Morny Wing – Ballyheron (1921), Waygood (1923), Rock Star (1930), Rosewell (1938), Windsor Slipper (1942), Bright News (1946)

Leading trainer (14 wins):
 Aidan O'Brien – Desert King (1997), Galileo (2001), High Chaparral (2002), Dylan Thomas (2006), Soldier of Fortune (2007), Frozen Fire (2008), Fame and Glory (2009), Cape Blanco (2010), Treasure Beach (2011), Camelot (2012), Australia (2014), Capri (2017), Sovereign (2019), Santiago (2020)

Leading owner (15 wins): (includes part ownership)
 Michael Tabor – Desert King (1997), Montjeu (1999), Galileo (2001), High Chaparral (2002), Hurricane Run (2005), Dylan Thomas (2006), Soldier of Fortune (2007), Frozen Fire (2008), Fame and Glory (2009), Cape Blanco (2010), Treasure Beach (2011), Australia (2014), Capri (2017), Sovereign (2019), Santiago (2020)

A Unique Racing Record - Only Owner to complete the Derby and Grand National Double
 
 William Brophy, Herbertstown House, Two-Mile-House, Naas, Co. Kildare. Farmer, Breeder and Owner 
In 1880 William Brophy completed a unique double by owning the winner of both the Irish Derby with King of the Bees and the Irish Grand National with Controller.   Also uniquely both winners were out of the same Dam Winged Bee.

Winners since 1946

 Premonition finished first in 1953 but was disqualified.

Earlier winners

 1866: Selim
 1867: Golden Plover
 1868: Madeira
 1869: The Scout
 1870: Billy Pitt
 1871: Maid of Athens
 1872: Trickstress
 1873: Kyrle Daly
 1874: Ben Battle
 1875: Innishowen
 1876: Umpire
 1877: Redskin
 1878: Madame du Barry
 1879: Soulouque
 1880: King of the Bees
 1881: Master Ned
 1882: Sortie
 1883: Sylph
 1884: Theologian
 1885: St Kevin
 1886: Theodemir
 1887: Pet Fox
 1888: Theodolite
 1889: Tragedy
 1890: Kentish Fire
 1891: Narraghmore
 1892: Roy Neil
 1893: Bowline
 1894: Blairfinde
 1895: Portmarnock
 1896: Gulsalberk
 1897: Wales
 1898: Noble Howard
 1899: Oppressor
 1900: Gallinaria
 1901: Carrigavalla
 1902: St Brendan
 1903: Lord Rossmore
 1904: Royal Arch
 1905: Flax Park
 1906: Killeagh
 1907: Orby
 1908: Wild Bouquet
 1909: Bachelor's Double
 1910: Aviator
 1911: Shanballymore
 1912: Civility
 1913: Bachelor's Wedding
 1914: Land of Song
 1915: Ballaghtobin
 1916: Furore
 1917: First Flier
 1918: King John
 1919: Loch Lomond
 1920: He Goes
 1921: Ballyheron
 1922: Spike Island
 1923: Waygood
 1924: Haine / Zodiac 1
 1925: Zionist
 1926: Embargo
 1927: Knight of the Grail
 1928: Baytown
 1929: Kopi
 1930: Rock Star
 1931: Sea Serpent
 1932: Dastur
 1933: Harinero
 1934: Patriot King / Primero
 1935: Museum
 1936: Raeburn
 1937: Phideas
 1938: Rosewell
 1939: Mondragon
 1940: Turkhan
 1941: Sol Oriens
 1942: Windsor Slipper
 1943: The Phoenix
 1944: Slide On
 1945: Piccadilly

See also
 Horse racing in Ireland
 Irish Triple Crown race winners
 List of Irish flat horse races

References

 Paris-Turf:
 Racing Post:

 galopp-sieger.de – Irish Derby Stakes.
 horseracingintfed.com – International Federation of Horseracing Authorities – Irish Derby (2018).
 irishracinggreats.com – Irish Derby (Group 1).
 pedigreequery.com – Irish Derby – Curragh.
 tbheritage.com – Irish Derby Stakes.
 
 The Sweeney guide to the Irish turf from 1501 to 2001 /by Tony & Annie Sweeney in association with Francis Hyland ; photographs by Caroline Norris ... [et al.].

Annual sporting events in Ireland
Flat races in Ireland
Curragh Racecourse
Flat horse races for three-year-olds
Recurring sporting events established in 1866
1866 establishments in Ireland
Summer events in the Republic of Ireland